The 1873 United States Senate election in Pennsylvania was held on January 21, 1873. Simon Cameron was re-elected by the Pennsylvania General Assembly to the United States Senate.

Results
The Pennsylvania General Assembly, consisting of the House of Representatives and the Senate, convened on January 21, 1873, to elect a Senator to fill the term beginning on March 4, 1873. Incumbent Republican Simon Cameron, who was elected in 1867, was a successful candidate for re-election to another term. The results of the vote of both houses combined are as follows:

|-
|-bgcolor="#EEEEEE"
| colspan="3" align="right" | Totals
| align="right" | 133
| align="right" | 100.00%
|}

See also 
 United States Senate elections, 1872 and 1873

References

External links
Pennsylvania Election Statistics: 1682-2006 from the Wilkes University Election Statistics Project

1873
Pennsylvania
United States Senate